The Union of Progressive Surinamese is a political party in Suriname. 
At the last legislative elections (25 May 2005), in an alliance with the Party for Democracy and Development through Unity, the party won 4.9% of the popular vote and no seats in the National Assembly.

Political parties in Suriname